This is a list of aircraft manufacturers sorted alphabetically by International Civil Aviation Organization (ICAO)/common name. Each listing contains the ICAO/common name (presented in bold), manufacturer's name(s), country and other data, with the known years of operation in parentheses.

The existence of an ICAO name does not mean that a manufacturer is still in operation today, just that some of the aircraft produced by that manufacturer are still flying.

D
DAC, Dutch Aeroplane Company VOF – Netherlands
Damoure-Fabre, Damoure et Fabre – France
D'Apuzzo, Nicholas E. D'Apuzzo – United States
DAR, Darjawna Aeroplanna Rabotilniza – Bulgaria, (Dargeavna Aeroplanna Rabotilnitsa – Country Airplane Factory)
Darracq Motor Engineering Company
Dart, Dart Aircraft Company – United States
Dart Aircraft Limited – United Kingdom
DASA, Daimler-Benz Aerospace AG – Germany, (1989–2000) > EADS
DASA, Deutsche Aerospace AG – Germany
DASA-Rockwell, see DASA and ROCKWELL – Germany/United States
Dassault, Avions Marcel Dassault – France, (1945–1969) > Dassault-Breguet
Dassault-Breguet, Avions Marcel Dassault-Bréguet Aviation – France, (1969–1990) > Dassault Aviation
Dassault, Dassault Aviation (1990–present) – France
Dassault-Breguet/dornier, see DASSAULT-BREGUET and DORNIER – France/Switzerland
Dätwyler, MDC Max Dätwyler AG – Switzerland
Davis, Leeon D. Davis – United States
Dayton-Wright, Dayton-Wright Airplane Co. – United States, (?-1923) > Consolidated Aircraft
De Havilland, The De Havilland Aircraft Company Ltd – United Kingdom, (1920–1958) (DH) > Hawker Siddeley
De Havilland Australia, The De Havilland Aircraft Company Pty Ltd – Australia, (DHA) > Boeing
De Havilland Canada, Bombardier Aerospace De Havilland – Canada, (1928–1989) (DHC) > Bombardier Aerospace
De Havilland Canada, De Havilland Division of Boeing of Canada Ltd – Canada
De Havilland Canada, De Havilland Inc – Canada
De Havilland Canada, The De Havilland Aircraft of Canada Ltd – Canada
De Schelde, Koninklijke Maatschappij De Schelde – Netherlands
Deborde-Rolland, Yves Deborde et Jean-Louis Rolland – France
Delisle, Club Aeronautique Delisle Inc – Canada
Denel Aerospace Systems, Denel Aerospace Systems, Denel Aviation – South Africa
Denize, Robert Denize – France
Denney, Denney Aerocraft Company – United States
Department of Aircraft Production, Australian government, Australia, (1939–1941) later known as Government Aircraft Factories
Derazona, PT Derazona Aviation Industry – Indonesia
Derringer, Derringer Aircraft Company LLC – United States
Detroit Aircraft Corporation, Detroit Aircraft Corporation – United States, (July 10, 1922 – October 27, 1931)
Deutsche Airbus, Deutsche Airbus GmbH – Germany
DFS, Deutsche Forschungsanstalt für Segelflug – Germany, (1925–1945) (Deutsches Forschungsinstitut fur Segelflug – German Research Institute for Sailplane Flight)
Dewoitine, Constructions Aéronautiques Emile Dewoitine – France
Dewoitine, Société Aéronautique Française, Avions Dewoitine – France
DF Helicopters, DF Helicopters SRL – Italy
DFW, Deutsche Flugzeugwerke – Germany
DG Flugzeugbau, DG Flugzeugbau GmbH – Germany
Diamond, Diamond Aircraft Industries GmbH – Austria
Diamond, Diamond Aircraft Industries Inc – Canada
Distar Air,  Ústí nad Orlicí, Czech Republic
Dickey, Shirl Dickey Enterprises – United States
Dijkman-Dulkes, Cor Dijkman-Dulkes – Netherlands
DINFIA, Dirección Nacional de Investigaciones y Fabricaciones Aeronáuticas – Argentina, (1957–?)
DKBA FGUP, Federal Unitary State Enterprise, "Dolgoprudniy Design
Bureau of Automatics" ("DIRIZHABLESTROI USSR ENTERPRISE" in 1932–1940) – key state Russian manufacturer of airships, balloons, aerostats, blimps. – Russian Federation
Dirgantara, PT Dirgantara Indonesia – Indonesia
DM Aerospace, DM Aerospace Ltd – United Kingdom
Doak, Doak Aircraft Company – United States
DOMA, DOMA INDUSTRIAL LTDA – BRAZIL
Donnet – France
Donnet-Denhaut – France
Dorna, H F Dorna Company – Iran
Dornier, AG für Dornier-Flugzeuge – Switzerland
Dornier, Dornier GmbH – Germany, (?-1959) > FUS
Dornier, Dornier Luftfahrt GmbH – Germany, (?-1989) > DASA
Dornier, Dornier-Werke GmbH – Germany
Douglas, Douglas Aircraft Company Inc – United States, (1920–1967) > McDonnell-Douglas
Downer, Downer Aircraft Industries Inc – United States
Dragon Fly, Dragon Fly Srl – Italy
Dream, Dream Aircraft Inc – Canada
Driggs, Driggs Aircraft Corporation – United States
Druine, Avions Roger Druine – France
DSK, DSK Aircraft – United States
DSK Airmotive, DSK Airmotive – United States
Dubna, Proizvodstvenno-Tekhnichesky Kompleks Dubnenskogo Mashinostroitelnogo Zavod AO – Russia
Dudek Paragliding, Bydgoszcz, Poland
 Dufaux, Armand and Henri Dufaux – Switzerland
Duigan, John Duigan – Australia
Dumod, Dumod Corp. – United States
Durand, William H. Durand – United States
Duruble, Roland Duruble – France
du Temple, Félix du Temple – France
Dyke, John W. Dyke – United States
Dyn'Aéro, Société Dyn'Aéro – France
Dynamic Sport, Kielce, Poland
D'Yves Air Pub, La Chapelle-en-Vexin, France 
 Daher aircraft
 Deutsche aircraft

E
 E. D. Abbott – see Abbott
E & K, E & K Sp z oo – Poland
EAA, Experimental Aircraft Association Inc – United States
EAC, Etudes Aéronautiques & Commerciales SARL – France
EADS, European Aeronautic Defence and Space Company – France/Germany/Spain, (2000–present) (EADS)
EADS 3 Sigma (formerly 3 Sigma) – Greece
Eagle, Eagle Aircraft Company – United States
Eagle Aircraft, Eagle Aircraft Australia Ltd – Australia
Eagle Aircraft, Eagle Aircraft International – Australia
Eagle Aircraft, Eagle Aircraft Pty Ltd – Australia
Eagles Wing Corporation, Normandy, Tennessee, United States
Early Bird, Early Bird Aircraft Company – United States
EasyUp, Medford, Oregon, United States
EAY – Empresa Aeronáutica Ypiranga – Brazil
Eberhart, Eberhart – United States
Eclipse, Eclipse Aviation Corporation – United States
Ector, Ector Aircraft Company – United States
Edel Paragliders, Gwangju, South Korea
Edgar Percival, Edgar Percival Aircraft Ltd. (defunct) – United Kingdom 
Edgley, Edgley Aircraft Ltd – United Kingdom
EDRA, EDRA Aeronáutica – Brazil
EDRA, EDRA Helicentro Peças e Manutençao – Brazil
EEL (Entwicklung und Erprobung von Leichtflugzeugen), Putzbrunn, Germany
EHI, EH Industries Ltd – United Kingdom/Italy
Eich, James P. Eich – United States
EIRI, Eiriavion OY – Finland
EIS, EIS Aircraft GmbH – Germany
Ekolot, PPHU Ekolot – Poland
EFW, Eidgenössische Flugzeugwerke Emmen  – Switzerland, (Federal Aircraft Factory)
ELA Aviación, ELA Aviación SL – Spain
Elbit, Elbit Systems Ltd – Israel
Elicotteri Meridionali, Elicotteri Meridionali – Italy, (1967–?)
Elitar, Ehlitar OOO – Russia
Ellison-Mahon Aircraft,  – US (Seattle, Washington)
Elmwood, Elmwood Aviation – Canada
Emair, Emair Inc – United States
Emair, Emair, Division of Emroth Company – United States
EMBRAER, Empresa Brasileira de Aeronáutica SA – Brazil
EMBRAER-FMA, see EMBRAER and FMA – Brazil/Argentina
Emroth, Emroth Company – United States
ENAER, Empresa Nacional de Aeronáutica – Chile
English Electric, English Electric Aviation Ltd – United Kingdom, (?-1959) > British Aircraft Corporation
English Electric, English Electric Company Ltd – United Kingdom
Enstrom, R. J. Enstrom Corporation – United States
Enstrom, The Enstrom Helicopter Corporation – United States
Epervier, Epervier Aviation SA – Belgium
Epps, Ben T. Epps – United States
ERCO, Engineering and Research Corporation – United States
ERPALS, Erpals Industrie, Etudes et Réalisations de Prototypes pour l'Aviation Légère et Sportive – France
Esnault-Pelterie, Robert Esnault-Pelterie – France
Ethiopian Airlines, Ethiopian Airlines Enterprise – Ethiopia
Ethiopian Airlines, Ethiopian Airlines SC – Ethiopia
Etrich, Etrich – Austria
Euler, Euler – Germany
Eurocopter, Eurocopter Canada Ltd – Canada, (1992–present)
Eurocopter, Eurocopter GIE – France/Germany
Eurocopter, Eurocopter SA – France/Germany
Eurocopter, Eurocopter SAS – France/Germany
Eurocopter-Kawasaki, see EUROCOPTER and KAWASAKI – France/Germany/Japan
Euro-Enaer, Euro-Enaer Holding BV – Netherlands
Eurofighter, Eurofighter Jagdflugzeug GmbH – Germany/UK/Italy/Spain
Euronef, Euronef SA – Belgium
Europa, Europa Aviation Ltd – United Kingdom
Eurospace, Eurospace Costruzioni Srl – Italy
Evangel, Evangel Aircraft Corporation – United States
Evans, Evans Aircraft – United States
Evans, W. Samuel Evans – United States
Evektor-Aerotechnik, Evektor-Aerotechnik AS – Czech Republic
Evolution Aircraft, Redmond, Oregon, United States
EWR, Entwicklungsring-Süd – Germany
Excalibur, Excalibur Aviation Company – United States
Exclusive, Exclusive Aviation – United States
Experimental Aviation, Experimental Aviation Inc – United States
Explorair, Ebringen, Breisgau-Hochschwarzwald, Baden-Württemberg, Germany
Explorer (1), Explorer Aviation – United States
Explorer (2), Explorer Aircraft Inc – United States
Express, Express Aircraft Company LLC – United States
Express, Express Design Inc – United States
Extra, Extra Flugzeugbau GmbH – Germany
Extra, Extra Flugzeugproduktions- und Vertriebs- GmbH – Germany

F
F+W Emmen, Eidgenössisches Flugzeugwerk-Fabrique Fédérale d'Avions-Fabbrica Federale d'Aeroplani – B817
Fabrica de Avioanes, Fabrica de Avioanes SET – Romania
Fabrica Militar de Aviones, Fábrica Militar de Aviones – Argentina, (1927–1957) (FMA, or Military Aircraft Factory) > DINFIA > Lockheed Martin Aircraft Argentina SA
Fairchild (1), Fairchild Aircraft Corporation – United States, (1925–1996) > FairchildDornier
Fairchild (1), Fairchild Aircraft Inc – United States
Fairchild (1), Fairchild Aviation Corporation – United States
Fairchild (1), Fairchild Engine & Airplane Corporation – United States
Fairchild (1), Fairchild Industries Inc – United States
Fairchild (1), Fairchild Stratos Corporation – United States
Fairchild (2), Fairchild Aircraft Ltd. (Canada)
Fairchild Dornier, Fairchild Aerospace Corporation – United States/Germany, (1996–2002) > Avcraft, M7 Aerospace
Fairchild Hiller, Fairchild Hiller Corporation – United States
Fairchild Swearingen, Fairchild Swearingen Corporation – United States
Fairey, Fairey Aviation Company Ltd – United Kingdom
Fairtravel, Fairtravel Ltd – United Kingdom
Fajr, Fajr Aviation & Composites Industry – Iran
Falconar, Falconar Air Engineering – Canada
Falconar, Falconar Aircraft Ltd – Canada
Falconar, Falconar Avia Inc – Canada
Fanaero-Chile, Fanaero-Chile – Chile
Farigoux, Georges Farigoux – France
Farman Aviation Works, Farman Aviation Works – France, (1914–1936) > Ateliers Aéronautiques de Suresnes, SNCAC
Farrington, Farrington Aircraft Corporation, Paducah, Kentucky, United States
Fauvel, Fauvel – France
Ferber, Ferber – France, (1906) > Antoinette
Feugray, G. Feugray – France
FFA, FFA Flugzeugwerke Altenrhein AG – Switzerland
FFA, Flug und Fahrzeugwerke AG – Switzerland
FFT, Gesellschaft für Flugzeug- und Faserverbund Technologie – Germany
FFV, Försvarets Fabriksverk – Sweden, (later Förenade Fabriksverken)
FIAT, Fiat SpA – Italy, (?-1969) > Aeritalia
Fieseler, Fieseler Flugzeugbau – Germany
Fieseler, Gerhard Fieseler Werke GmbH – Germany
Fighter Escort Wings, Fighter Escort Wings – United States
Fike, William J. Fike – United States
Finavitec, Patria Finavitec OY – Finland
Firebird Sky Sports, Bitburg, Germany
Fisher, Fisher Flying Products Inc – United States
Fisher Aero, Fisher Aero Corporation – United States
Flaglor, K. Flaglor – United States
Flair, Flair Aviation Company – United States
Fläming Air, Fläming Air GmbH – Germany
Fleet, Fleet Aircraft Inc – United States, (1928–1929) > Consolidated Aircraft > Fleet Aircraft of Canada
Fleet, Fleet Aircraft Ltd – Canada, (1930–1957)
Fleet, Fleet Manufacturing & Aircraft Ltd – Canada
Fleet, Fleet Manufacturing Ltd – Canada
Fleetwings, Fleetwings, Inc. – United States
Fletcher, Fletcher Aviation Company – United States
Fletcher, Fletcher Aviation Corporation – United States
Flettner, Flettner – Germany
Flight Design, Flight Design GmbH – Germany
Flight Engineers, Flight Engineers Ltd – New Zealand
Flightworks, Flightworks Corporation – United States
Flitzer, Flitzer Aero Publishing Company – United States
FLS, FLS Aerospace (Lovaux) Ltd – United Kingdom
FLSZ, Flight Level Six-Zero Inc – United States
Flug und Fahrzeugwerke, Flug und Fahrzeugwerke – Switzerland
Flug Werk, Flug Werk GmbH – Germany
Flugzeug Union Süd, Flugzeug-Union Süd GmbH – Germany
Flyer, Flyer Industria Aeronautica Ltda – Brazil
Fly Castelluccio Paramotor Paragliding and Trike srl, Ascoli Piceno, Italy
Flygindustri, AB Flygindustri – Sweden, (1925–1935) (AFI) > Malmö Flygindustri
Flygkompaniets tygverkstäder Malmslätt (FVM) – Sweden 
Flying Machines s.r.o., Czech Republic.
FMA, Fábrica Militar de Aviones – Argentina
FMA, Fábrica Militar de Aviones SA – Argentina
Focke Achgelis, Focke-Achgelis – Germany
Focke-Wulf, Focke-Wulf Flugzeugbau AG – Germany
Focke-Wulf, Focke-Wulf GmbH – Germany
Fokker, Fokker BV – Netherlands
Fokker, Fokker-VFW BV – Netherlands
Fokker, NV Koninklijke Nederlandsche Vliegtuigenfabriek Fokker – Netherlands
Fokker, NV Koninklijke Nederlandse Vliegtuigenfabriek Fokker – Netherlands
Folland, Folland – United Kingdom, (1937–1959)
Ford Motor Company, Ford – United States, (1925–?)
Fornaire, Fornaire Aircraft Company – United States
Forney, Forney Aircraft Manufacturing Company – United States
Foster Wikner, Foster Wikner – United Kingdom
Fouga, Etablissements Fouga et Cie – France
Found, Found Aircraft Canada Inc – Canada
Found, Found Brothers Aviation Ltd – Canada
Four Winds, Four Winds Aircraft LLC – United States
Fournier, Avions Fournier SA – France
Fournier, Bureau d'Etudes Fournier – France
Fournier, Fournier Aviation – France
Fournier, René Fournier – France
Fowler Airplane Corporation - San Francisco, California
Foxcon Aviation, Mackay, Queensland, Australia
Frakes, Frakes Aviation Inc – United States
Freebird Airplane Company, Marshville, North Carolina, United States
Free Bird Innovations, Inc, Detroit Lakes, Minnesota, United States
FreeX GmbH,  Egling, Germany
Free Spirit, Free Spirit Aircraft Company Inc – United States
Freedom Master, Freedom Master Corporation – United States
Freewing, Freewing Aerial Robotics Corporation – United States
Friedrichshafen, Friedrichshafen, Württemberg, Germany > Dornier (1922) 
Frontier, Frontier Aircraft Inc – United States
Fry, Fry Aircraft Design – Switzerland
Fuji, Fuji Heavy Industries Ltd – Japan
Fuji, Fuji Jukogyo K. K. – Japan
Funk, Funk Aircraft Company – United States
FVM, Centrala Verkstader Malmslatt – Sweden

G
GAF, Government Aircraft Factories – Australia, (1941–1987) > Aerospace Technologies of Australia
Gannet, Gannet Aircraft – United States
Ganzavia, Ganzavia Kft – Hungary
Gardan, Avions Yves Gardan – France (see Constructions Aéronautiques du Béarn)
Garland, The Garland Aircraft Company – United Kingdom
Garland Aerospace, Camden, New South Wales, Australia
Garrison, Peter Garrison – United States
Gastambide-Mengin, Gastambide-Mengin – France
Gatard, Avions A. Gatard – France
Gatard, Société des Avions Statoplan, A. Gatard – France
Gates Learjet, Gates Learjet Corporation – United States
Gavilan, El Gavilán SA – Colombia
GEFA-FLUG GmbH, GEFA-FLUG GmbH – Germany, (1975–present) (Gesellschaft zur Entwicklung und Förderung Aerostatischer Flugsysteme GmbH – Company for the Development and Promotion of Aerostatic Aerial Systems)
Gemini Powered Parachutes,  Culver, Indiana, United States
Genair, Genair – South Africa
General Aircraft, General Aircraft Corporation – United States
General Aircraft Limited, General Aircraft Ltd – United Kingdom, (1931–1948) (GAL) > Blackburn and General Aircraft
General Atomics, General Atomics – United States
General Avia, General Avia Costruzioni Aeronautiche SRL – Italy
General Aviation Design Bureau of Ukraine – Kiev, Ukraine
General Dynamics, General Dynamics Corporation – United States
General Motors, Eastern Aircraft Division of General Motors Corporation – United States
German Bianco, German Bianco SA, Fabrica Argentina de Aerodinos – Argentina
Giles, Richard Giles – United States
Gin Gliders, Yongin, South Korea
Gippsland, Mahindra Aerospace India – Australia
Giravia, Giravia – France
Glaser-Dirks, Glaser-Dirks Flugzeugbau GmbH – Germany
Glasflügel – Germany
Glass, Glass Aircraft de Colombia – Colombia
Glassic, Glassic Composites LLC – United States
Glendower Aircraft Company, Glendower Aircraft Company – United Kingdom
Global, Global Helicopter Technology Inc – United States
Globe, Globe Aircraft Corporation – United States
Gloster Aircraft Company Ltd – United Kingdom, > Whitworth Gloster Aircraft Ltd. 1961 Hawker Siddeley Group
Gloucestershire Aircraft, Gloucestershire Aircraft Co. – United Kingdom, > Gloster 1926
Głowiński, Bronisław Głowiński – Poland
Goair, Goair Products – Australia
Golden Circle, Golden Circle Air Inc – United States
Gomolzig, Herbert Gomolzig Ingenieurbüro – Germany
Goodrich, Goodrich Corporation – Headquarters North Carolina – United States
Goodyear, Goodyear Aircraft Corporation – United States
Gothaer Waggonfabrik, Gothaer Waggonfabrik – Germany, (GWF)
Gourdou-Leseurre, Gourdou-Leseurre – France
Government Aircraft Factory, Government Aircraft Factory – Finland
Gradient sro, Prague, Czech Republic
Grahame-White, Grahame-White Aviation Co. Ltd. – United Kingdom, (Claude Grahame-White)
Granville Brothers Aircraft, Granville Brothers Aircraft – United States
Great Lakes, Great Lakes Aircraft Company Inc – United States
Great Lakes, Great Lakes Aircraft Corporation – United States
Great Lakes, Great Lakes Aircraft Inc – United States
Great Plains, Great Plains Aircraft Supply Company Inc – United States
Green Sky Adventures, Hawthorne, Florida, United States
Grega, John W. Grega – United States (see Pietenpol Air Camper)
Gremont, Gremont – France
Griffon, Griffon Aerospace Inc – United States
Grinvalds, Jean Grinvalds – France
Grob, Burkhart Grob Flugzeugbau GmbH & Co kg – Germany
Groen, Groen Brothers Aviation Inc – United States
Grosso, Grosso Aircraft Inc – United States
Grove, Grove Aircraft Company – United States
Grover, Grover Aircraft Corporation – United States
Grumman, Grumman Aircraft Engineering Corporation – United States
Grumman, Grumman Corporation – United States, (1930–1994)
Grumman American, Grumman American Aviation Corporation – United States
Guizhou, Guizhou Aviation Industrial Corporation – China
Gulfstream Aerospace, Gulfstream Aerospace Corporation – United States, (1978–)
Gulfstream American, Gulfstream American Corporation – United States
Gyro-Kopp-Ters, Lake City Florida, United States
Gyroflug, Gyroflug Ingenieursgesellschaft mbH – Germany

See also
 Aircraft
 List of aircraft engine manufacturers
 List of aircraft manufacturers

D

de:Liste der Flugzeughersteller
fr:Liste des constructeurs aéronautiques